Sandhi ("joining") is a cover term for a wide variety of sound changes that occur at morpheme or word boundaries. Examples include fusion of sounds across word boundaries and the alteration of one sound depending on nearby sounds or the grammatical function of the adjacent words. Sandhi belongs to morphophonology.

Sandhi occurs in many languages, particularly in the phonology of Indian languages (especially Sanskrit, Tamil,  Sinhala, Telugu, Marathi, Hindi, Pali, Kannada, Bengali, Assamese, Malayalam). Many dialects of British English show linking and intrusive R.

A subset of sandhi called tone sandhi more specifically refers to tone changes between words and syllables. This is a common feature of many tonal languages such as Mandarin Chinese.

Types

Internal and external sandhi 
Sandhi can be either
 internal, at morpheme boundaries within words, such as syn- + pathy: sympathy, or
 external, at word boundaries, such as the pronunciation "tem books" for ten books in some dialects of English. The linking  process of some dialects of English ("I saw-r-a film" in British English) is a kind of external sandhi, as are French liaison (pronunciation of usually silent final consonants of words before words beginning with vowels) and Italian raddoppiamento fonosintattico (lengthening of initial consonants of words after certain words ending in vowels).
It may be extremely common in speech, but sandhi (especially external) is typically ignored in spelling, as is the case in English (exceptions: the distinction between a and an; the prefixes syn-, in-, en-, and con-). Sandhi is, however, reflected in the orthography of Sanskrit, Sinhala, Telugu, Marathi, Pali and some other Indian languages, as with Italian in the case of compound words with lexicalised syntactic gemination.

External sandhi effects can sometimes become morphologised (apply only in certain morphological and syntactic environments) as in Tamil and, over time, turn into consonant mutations.

Tone sandhi 
Most tonal languages have tone sandhi in which the tones of words alter according to certain rules. An example is the behavior of Mandarin Chinese; in isolation, tone 3 is often pronounced as a falling-rising tone. When a tone 3 occurs before another tone 3, however, it changes into tone 2 (a rising tone), and when it occurs before any of the other tones, it is pronounced as a low falling tone with no rise at the end.

An example occurs in the common greeting   (with two words containing underlying tone 3), which is in practice pronounced . The first word is pronounced with tone 2, but the second is unaffected.

Examples

Celtic languages 

In Celtic languages, the consonant mutation sees the initial consonant of a word to change according to its morphological or syntactic environment. 
Following are some examples from Breton, Irish, Scottish Gaelic, and Welsh:

French
The French liaison, in which a word-final consonant that is normally silent when occurring at the end of a phrase or before another consonant, is pronounced as if part of the next word when followed by a vowel, can be considered a form of external sandhi.

Japanese

Korean 
Korean has sandhi which occurs in the final consonant or consonant cluster, such that a morpheme can have two pronunciations depending on whether or not it is followed by a vowel. For example, the root "읽" /ik/, meaning read, sounds like /iɾk/ before vowels, such as in, 읽으세요 /iɾkɯse̞jo/, meaning please read. Some roots can also aspirate following consonants, denoted by the letter ㅎ (hieut) in the final consonant. This causes  "다" /tɐ/ to become /tʰɐ/ in 않다 /ɐntʰɐ/ (to be not).

See also 
 Alternation (linguistics)
 Crasis
 Elision
 Liaison (French)
 Linking and intrusive R
 Movable nu

References

External links 

 Sandhi Calculator by Vedic Society

Morphophonology
Sanskrit words and phrases
Vyakarana
Phonaesthetics